Sorcery Saga: Curse of the Great Curry God is a video game developed by Compile Heart for the PlayStation Vita. It is based on the original Madou Monogatari released in 1989. The game was announced in December 2012, and was released on 28 March 2013 in Japan, 10 December 2013 in North America via Aksys Games, and on 21 February 2014 in Europe via Rising Star Games. A Microsoft Windows version, produced and published by Ghostlight, was released 4 June 2018.

Gameplay
Sorcery Saga: Curse of the Great Curry God is a dungeon crawler video game set in a large world with a number of diverse dungeons. The dungeons are automatically and randomly generated. The game also features various cities, which have various events. Gamers who pre-order the game obtain a "bikini download code". Aksys released the game as a standalone game, in addition to a limited edition package titled "Hot and Spicy, Everything Nicey Limited Edition". The Limited Edition copy sold in North America include a specially designed bib, plastic spoon and plate.

Reception 

Bradly Hale of Hardcore Gamer gave the game a 4/5, calling it "without a doubt one of the most traditional roguelikes to come out in a while." Wesley Ruscher of Destructoid awarded Sorcery Saga a 6/10, summarising it as "a title that took me by surprise. It may not the best of games, but it’s far from the worst. Its lighthearted nature is hard to recommend if you're not a fan of the genre, but if you're willing to try something a little different, there’s enough delicious pleasantries served throughout to satisfy anyone's dungeon-crawling cravings."

IGN's Meghan Sullivan rated the game 7.5/10, stating "Although Sorcery Saga’s roguelike elements and minor glitches made me feel incredibly frustrated at times, I still enjoyed the story and characters enough to power through its multileveled dungeons just to see what happened once the credits rolled. If you’re looking to expand your gaming palette, Sorcery Saga is a tasty little morsel for the Vita that offers both plenty of challenges and lots of laughs" and that "If you've never played a roguelike RPG, Sorcery Saga is a nice, bite-sized entry point into the genre."

Danielle Riendeau of Polygon was more critical of the game, criticising the "tedious mechanics, arbitrary deaths and disturbing, off-putting writing", and saying "Sorcery Saga: Curse of the Great Curry God treated me like a bad pet, whacking my nose with a newspaper without ever showing me what I did wrong. I like difficult games, but it was impossible to feel like I was progressing", scoring Sorcery Saga 5/10. US Gamer's Cassandra Khaw gave Sorcery Saga a positive review, claiming "Sorcery Saga: Curse of the Great Curry God is excellent albeit not terribly inspired. It keeps to traditional motifs, eschewing more grandiose ideas in favour of a more familiar flavor" and rewarding it four stars out of five.

Notes

References

External links
Official Japanese website
Official North American website

2013 video games
Compile Heart games
Fantasy video games
Video games about curses
Video games developed in Japan
Role-playing video games
Video games featuring female protagonists
PlayStation Vita games
Windows games
Rising Star Games games
Ghostlight games